Eisenhower Bridge may refer to:
Eisenhower Bridge (Milton, Iowa)
Eisenhower Bridge (Mississippi River)